Englebert Opdebeeck (born 27 December 1946) is a former Belgian cyclist. He competed in the team time trial at the 1968 Summer Olympics.

References

External links
 

1946 births
Living people
Belgian male cyclists
Olympic cyclists of Belgium
Cyclists at the 1968 Summer Olympics
People from Zemst
Cyclists from Flemish Brabant